Reginald Horace "Horrie" Lyons (4 January 1876 – 28 May 1921) was an Australian rules footballer who played with South Melbourne and St Kilda in the Victorian Football League (VFL).

He commenced his football career with South Melbourne in 1895 and later played for Prahran and Richmond in the Victorian Football Association (VFA).

References

External links 

1876 births
1921 deaths
Australian rules footballers from Melbourne
Sydney Swans players
St Kilda Football Club players
Richmond Football Club (VFA) players
Prahran Football Club players
People from St Kilda, Victoria